{{DISPLAYTITLE:C30H46NO7P}}
The molecular formula C30H46NO7P (molar mass: 563.66 g/mol, exact mass: 563.3012 u) may refer to:

 Ceronapril, a phosphonate ACE inhibitor that was never marketed
 Fosinopril, an angiotensin converting enzyme (ACE) inhibitor